The 2013 West Coast Conference men's basketball tournament was held March 6–11, 2013 at the Orleans Arena in the Las Vegas-area community of Paradise, Nevada. Gonzaga, which entered the tournament as the top-ranked team in both major polls, claimed the school's 12th tournament title overall and 10th under current head coach Mark Few.

Format
For the second consecutive year the tournament featured a 9-team single elimination format. The 1 and 2 seeds received a bye to the semifinals while the 3 and 4 seeds received a bye to the quarterfinals.  The tournament began on Wednesday, March 6 with an 8/9 game. The second round took place on Thursday, March 7. Both the first and second rounds were shown by BYUtv Sports. The tournament quarterfinals were held on Friday, March 8, and were broadcast on ESPNU. The conference semifinals were held on Saturday, March 9, and aired  on ESPN2. The championship game was played on Monday, March 11, 2013, and was broadcast on television by ESPN and on national radio by Dial Global Sports.

Seeds
WCC Tiebreaker procedures are as follows:
1) Head-to-head
2) Better record against a higher seed
3) Higher RPI
In the case of USF and USD, they split the regular season series 1-1. Both were swept by Gonzaga, Saint Mary's, and Santa Clara, and went 1-1 against BYU and 5-1 against seeds lower than them, leading to the rare RPI tiebreaker.

x- USF's record is the record before the WCC tournament begins. USF has one more non-conference regular season game after the WCC Tournament.

Schedule

Bracket

All times listed are Pacific

Game Summaries

1st Round: Portland vs. Loyola Marymount
Series History: LMU leads series 45-43
Broadcasters: Dave McCann, Blaine Fowler, Steve Cleveland, and Jarom Jordan

2nd Round: San Francisco vs. Loyola Marymount
Series History: USF leads series 107-38
Broadcasters: Dave McCann and Blaine Fowler (Play-by-Play)  Steve Cleveland and Jarom Jordan (Halftime and Bridge Show)

2nd Round: San Diego vs. Pepperdine
Series History: Pepperdine leads series 56-39
Broadcasters: Dave McCann and Blaine Fowler (Play-by-Play) Steve Cleveland and Jarom Jordan (Halftime)

Quarterfinals: Santa Clara vs. Loyola Marymount
Series History: Santa Clara leads series 84-55
Broadcasters: Dave Flemming and Sean Farnham

Quarterfinals: BYU vs. San Diego 
BYU leads series 5-1
Broadcasters: Dave Flemming and Sean Farnham

Semifinal: #1 Gonzaga vs. Loyola Marymount
Series History: Gonzaga leads series 57-23
Broadcasters: Dave Flemming and Sean Farnham

Semifinal: Saint Mary's vs. San Diego
Series History: Saint Mary's leads series 40-35
Broadcasters: Dave Flemming and Sean Farnham

Championship: Gonzaga vs. Saint Mary's
Series History: Gonzaga leads series 57-27
Broadcasters: Dave Flemming and Sean Farnham (ESPN)/ Ted Robinson and Steve Lappas (Dial Global)

All-tournament team
Tournament MVP in bold.

See also
2012-13 NCAA Division I men's basketball season
West Coast Conference men's basketball tournament
2012–13 West Coast Conference men's basketball season
West Coast Conference women's basketball tournament
2013 West Coast Conference women's basketball tournament

References

Tournament
West Coast Conference men's basketball tournament
West Coast Athletic Conference men's basketball tournament
West Coast Athletic Conference men's basketball tournament
Basketball competitions in the Las Vegas Valley
College basketball tournaments in Nevada
College sports tournaments in Nevada